The Birmingham Walk of Stars is a walk of fame-style installation on the pedestrian pavement of Broad Street, Birmingham, England, which honours notable people from the Birmingham area or with significant connections with it. The scheme is organised and funded by the Broad Street Business Improvement District.

The Walk of Stars  honours residents of the city who have made a significant contribution to the arts sector, in music, television, film, theatre, sport, business and literacy.

Criteria
The criteria for a person to have their star added to the walk include that they must have performed at one of Birmingham's major venues such as the International Convention Centre (ICC), National Indoor Arena (NIA), Symphony Hall and The Rep theatre. They must also be originally from the area or have prominent links with Birmingham and the Midlands region.

History
The idea for a Walk of Fame style tribute was first thought of by a local Birmingham man Garry Raybould, who then approached the Broad Street Business Improvement District who developed the idea and created the name Broad Street Walk of Stars together with a brand and registration of the original website, www.walkofstars.co.uk which quickly became very popular and was chosen by Radio 2 as 'Website of the Day'. The first star to be honoured was Ozzy Osbourne on 6 July 2007. The event was held in Centenary Square and introduced by Elliott Webb from Birmingham's commercial radio station BRMB and the star was presented to Ozzy by Lord Mayor of Birmingham Randal Brew. The Ozzy Osbourne presentation created £1.7M worth of worldwide publicity for the area.

Comedian Jasper Carrott was the second person to have a star installed on Broad Street on 15 September 2007. The star was presented to him by the Lord Mayor of Birmingham during ArtsFest in front of a 10,000 strong crowd. In December 2007, Noddy Holder became the third inductee on the Walk of Stars which was presented to him on a canal boat, during the Broad Street Christmas Canal Boat Light Parade.

The stars were briefly fenced off following safety concerns about their polished surfaces. Leicestershire-based Charcon Specialist Products, who produced the stars, was consulted over the situation.

Murray Walker was inducted into the Walk of Stars. A joint induction took place on 12 September 2008 for BBC Radio 4 series The Archers and cast member Norman Painting. On 7 October 2008, the BBC announced that Julie Walters would be inducted. The following month founder member of Black Sabbath, Tony Iommi was inducted.

On 26 March 2009, it was announced that each of five local football clubs (Aston Villa, Birmingham City, Walsall, West Bromwich Albion and Wolverhampton Wanderers) would have a star commemorating their teams, a player, or a specific era. The presentation ceremonies will be staggered between May and August.

Stars honoured

Nominees
There used to be a Walk of Stars website listing other potential nominees on which the public are invited to vote. But this no longer exists. These include:

 Clive Owen
 The Moody Blues
 Electric Light Orchestra
 Benjamin Campbell
 Judas Priest
 Denise Lewis
Johnnie Walker
 Martin Shaw
 Benjamin Zephaniah
 Adrian Chiles
 Tiswas
 Sir Simon Rattle
 Cat Deeley
 Robert Plant
 Duran Duran
 The Move
 Bill Oddie
The Spencer Davis Group
 The King Bees

See also

 List of Walks of Fame

References

External links

Streets in Birmingham, West Midlands
Tourist attractions in Birmingham, West Midlands
Culture in Birmingham, West Midlands
Walks of fame
Halls of fame in England